Staffordville, also originally known as Stafford, is a residential neighbourhood in Lethbridge, Alberta, Canada that held village status between 1900 and 1913.

History 
Staffordville was founded in the 1890s as a coal mining community. It was named after William Stafford, mining engineer for the North Western Coal and Navigation Company. The Village of Stafford was incorporated in 1900. It was annexed by the City of Lethbridge in 1913.

Geography 
Staffordville is west of Stafford Drive North and north of 9 Avenue North in northern Lethbridge. The neighbourhoods of Senator Buchanan, St. Edwards, and Stafford Manor are to the south, east, and north respectively.

Demographics 

Staffordville has a population of 967 living in 450 dwellings in the City of Lehtbridge's 2012 municipal census.

See also 
List of former urban municipalities in Alberta
List of neighbourhoods in Lethbridge

References 

Neighbourhoods in Lethbridge